Ectoedemia reneella is a moth of the family Nepticulidae. It was described by Wilkinson in 1981. It is known from Florida.

The wingspan is about 6 mm.

References

Nepticulidae
Moths of North America
Moths described in 1981